"The Message" is a song by Grandmaster Flash and the Furious Five. It was released as a single by Sugar Hill Records on July 1, 1982, and was later featured on the group's debut studio album of the same name.

"The Message" was an early prominent hip hop song to provide a social commentary. The song's lyrics describe the stress of inner-city poverty. In the final verses it is described how a child born in the ghetto without perspective in life is lured away into crime, for which he is jailed until he commits suicide in his cell. The song ends with a brief skit in which the band members are arrested for no clear reason.

"The Message" took rap music from the house parties of its origin to the social platforms later developed by groups like Public Enemy and KRS-One. Melle Mel said in an interview with NPR: "Our group, like Flash and the Furious Five, we didn't actually want to do 'The Message' because we was used to doing party raps and boasting how good we are and all that."

The song was first written in 1980 by Duke Bootee and Melle Mel, in response to the 1980 New York City transit strike, which is mentioned in the song's lyrics. The line "A child is born with no state of mind, blind to the ways of mankind" was taken from the early Grandmaster Flash and the Furious Five track "Superrappin'" from 1979 on the Enjoy label.

Uses in popular culture 
The rhythm track has been sampled in various hip hop songs, including Sinbad's 1990 comedy album "Brain Damaged", the remix for the 1993 song "Check Yo Self" by Ice Cube, the 1997 song "Can't Nobody Hold Me Down" by Puff Daddy, the 2011 song "Teen Pregnancy" by Blank Banshee and the 2022 song "Players" by Coi Leray.

A line from the song was sampled in "Movement in Still Life" by BT, the title track from his 1999 album Movement in Still Life.

In 2007, the 25th anniversary of "The Message", Melle Mel changed the spelling of his first name to Mele Mel and released "M3 - The New Message" as the first single to his first ever solo album, Muscles. 2007 was also the year that Grandmaster Flash and the Furious Five became the first hip-hop act ever to be inducted into the Rock and Roll Hall of Fame.

A Swedish translation/adaption of the song, "Budskapet", was released by Timbuktu in May 2013, following the riots in Husby and other suburbs of Stockholm.

A reference to the lyrics was included in the song Cabinet Battle #1 from the 2015 musical Hamilton .

Reception

Accolades and usage in media
The song was ranked as number 1 "Track of the Year" for 1982 by NME.

Rolling Stone ranked "The Message" #51 in its List of Rolling Stone's 500 Greatest Songs of All Time, (9 December 2004). It had the highest position for any 1980s release and was the highest ranking hip-hop song on the list. In 2012 it was named the greatest hip-hop song of all time.

It was voted #3 on About.com's Top 100 Rap Songs, after Common's "I Used to Love H.E.R." and The Sugarhill Gang's "Rapper's Delight".

In 2002, its first year of archival, it was one of 50 recordings chosen by the Library of Congress to be added to the National Recording Registry, the first hip hop recording ever to receive this honor.

"The Message" was number 5 on VH1's 100 Greatest Songs of Hip Hop.

"The Message" is number 1 on HipHopGoldenAge's Top 100 Hip Hop Songs of the 1980s".

Music and structure 
 Dan Carins of The Sunday Times has described "The Message"'s musical innovation: "Where it was inarguably innovative, was in slowing the beat right down, and opening up space in the instrumentation—the music isn't so much hip-hop as noirish, nightmarish slow-funk, stifling and claustrophobic, with electro, dub and disco also jostling for room in the genre mix—and thereby letting the lyrics speak loud and clear". Not only does the song utilize an ingenious mix of musical genres to great effect, but it also allows the slow and pulsating beat to take a backseat to the stark and haunting lyrical content.

Critical reception 
In addition to being widely regarded as an all-time rap anthem, "The Message" has been credited by many critics as the song that catapulted emcees from the background to the forefront of hip hop. Thus, shifting the focus from the mixing and scratching of the grandmaster as the star, to the thoughts and lyrics of the emcee playing the star role.  David Hickley wrote in 2004 that "The Message" also crystallized a critical shift within rap itself.  It confirmed that emcees, or rappers,  had vaulted past the deejays as the stars of the music". In 2022, it was included in the list "The story of NME in 70 (mostly) seminal songs", at number 20: Mark Beaumont wrote that with this song, "the invigorating grooves of this early breakout rap hit laid the foundations for the [...] hip-hop wars to come".

Charts

Weekly charts

Year-end charts

Remixes 
 "The Message '95" (Die Fantastischen Vier Remix) (1995, East West Records)
 "The Message" – 1997, Deepbeats Records (DEEPCD001)

References

Further reading 
 Chang, Jeff. (2005) Can't Stop Won't Stop: A History of the Hip-Hop Generation. New York: St. Martin's Press.

External links 
 
 How we made: Jiggs Chase and Ed Fletcher on The Message

1981 songs
1982 singles
Protest songs
American hip hop songs
United States National Recording Registry recordings
Songs written by Sylvia Robinson
Songs written by Melle Mel
Political rap songs
Songs about depression
Songs about poverty
Songs about crime
Songs about prison
Songs about suicide
Sugar Hill Records (Hip-Hop label) singles